James Hasson (born 1 May 1992) is an Ireland international rugby league footballer who plays as a  forward for the South Sydney Rabbitohs in the NSW Cup. 

He previously played for the Manly Warringah Sea Eagles in the National Rugby League as well as the Salford Red Devils and Wakefield Trinity in the Super League.

Background
Born in Hillingdon, England, Hasson is of Irish descent and moved to Sydney, Australia at a young age. He played his junior rugby league for De La Salle Caringbah JRLFC, before being signed by the Cronulla-Sutherland Sharks.

Playing career

Early career
In 2011 and 2012, Hasson played for the Cronulla-Sutherland Sharks' NYC team. 

In 2013, he joined the Manly Warringah Sea Eagles on a 2-year contract.

2013
In round 8 of the 2013 NRL season, Hasson made his NRL début for Manly-Warringah against the St. George Illawarra Dragons. In October and November, he played in 3 games for Ireland in the 2013 Rugby League World Cup. He re-signed with Manly-Warringah on a one-year contract.

2015
On 6 August, Hasson signed a one-year contract with the Parramatta Eels starting in 2016.

2016
Hasson joined the Eels in 2016 however failed to make an appearance in first grade, instead featured 17 times for Eels feeder team Wentworthville Magpies in the NSW Cup.

He was called up to the Ireland squad for the 2017 Rugby League World Cup European Pool B qualifiers.

2017
Hasson again failed to break into the Parramatta Eels NRL side and was subsequently released mid season to Wakefield Trinity. 

After playing four games for Wakefield Trinity, he was then released by the club. 

Later that year he was chosen in Ireland's squad for the 2017 Rugby League World Cup.

2018
Hasson joined the St George Illawarra Dragons Intrust Super Premiership side for the 2018 season. He then left to join the Blacktown Workers for the remainder of the year.

2021
In 2021, Hasson joined the South Sydney NSW Cup squad.

2022
In 2022 Hasson was named in the Ireland squad for the 2021 Rugby League World Cup.

References

External links
2015 Manly Warringah Sea Eagles profile
SL profile
2017 RLWC profile
St George Illawarra Dragons ISP profile
Ireland profile

1992 births
Living people
English rugby league players
Australian people of Irish descent
Blacktown Workers players
British people of Irish descent
English emigrants to Australia
Ireland national rugby league team players
Manly Warringah Sea Eagles players
Rugby league players from Greater London
Rugby league props
Rugby league second-rows